Kushk-e Pain may refer to:
 Kushk-e Pain, Fars
 Kushk-e Pain, Kerman
 Kushk-e Pain, Semnan

See also
 Kushk-e Sofla (disambiguation)